One Room is a Japanese  original short anime television series produced by SMIRAL and animated by Typhoon Graphics. One Room is presented as a first-person narrative; the audience is the male protagonist. The anime has three different stories/routes, each with a different girl, in one room. The anime aired from January 11 to March 29, 2017. A second season by Zero-G aired from July 3 to September 25, 2018.  A third season aired from October 5 to December 21, 2020.

The male characters version intended for female audiences titled Room Mate aired from April to June 2017.

Characters

One Room
Male Protagonist (Momohara)
A man who moved to Tokyo for his job and moved into the apartment next-door to Yui's.

A 17-year-old third-year high school girl from Hokkaido who goes to Tokyo to take her college entrance exams and temporarily lives with her older sister.

Natsuki is a 14-year-old middle school student and the protagonist's younger sister who came to Tokyo for summer vacation and stays at his apartment.

A 21-year-old singer-songwriter. She made her debut as singer once but, since she's unable to follow-up, she ends up working as a part timer in Tokyo while chasing her dream. She and the protagonist are childhood friends and they reunited by chance in Tokyo.

A gymnast who was retired, and tried to look for a new job. She and the protagonist were neighbors as they lived in the same apartment, though she regarded him as a pervert for taking pictures of her during practice. Afterwards, she thanked him for helping her find employment.

A cheerful 15 year old girl who likes agriculture and gardening, and is actively in the Gardening Club with the male protagonist. Before then, she was not the most socialable person and she tried to use gardening as some sort of escape from reality and an excuse for isolation. 

A 24-year old office worker who likes to refer to herself as "Onee-san" (Big Sister). She lives in an apartment.

Room Mate
Female Protagonist
A woman who is the new manager at the dormitory where Takumi Ashihara, Aoi Nishina, and Shinya Miyasaka live.

A 19-year-old college school student who loves sport climbing. Although the first impression of him gives a "too-cool-for-you" vibe, he's a gentleman who cares about others.

A 17-year-old high school student stage actor whose parents are working overseas. He has a bright personality-- but he has a habit where sometimes he gets too much into his role.

A 25-year-old elite businessman who works in a famous company. He has an arrogant, pompous, and sadistic personality, but deeply cares about Takumi and Aoi as if they were his own brothers.

Media

Anime
One Room and Room Mate (tentatively titled One Room: Side M) were first announced by Entertainment label SMIRAL who started a website on Friday to announce that it is producing an original anime series of shorts that premiered in Japan in January. It consisted of 12 episodes, each 5 to 6 minutes long. Eiji Mano wrote the original story and Aose Shimoi wrote the scripts. Jin'nan Studio produced the sounds while F.M.F produced the music with the composition by Yamazo. Both One Room and Room Mate premiered on Tokyo MX with the following broadcast on Sun TV and online streaming via Niconico and AbemaTV.

One Room features an original design by Kantoku, while Yasuhiro Okuda is adapting the design into anime. The anime was first aired on January 11, 2017 on Tokyo MX and Sun TV along with online streaming via Niconico then finished on March 29, 2017. MAO sung opening theme for episode 1–4 titled , Rie Murakawa for episode 6–8 titled , and Suzuko Mimori for the last four episodes titled . A Blu-ray and DVD compilation containing all the 12 episodes and 3 unaired episodes will be released on May 26, 2017.

A second season of the One Room anime television series began airing on July 2, 2018, and finished on September 25, 2018. However, it was announced that Zero-G will replace Typhoon Graphics as the animation studio. In addition, Takuya Tani will be the new character designer and chief animation director, Shinji Takasuka will be joining as the art director, and Atsushi Furukawa will be the new color designer.

A third season has been announced, and aired from October 5 to December 21, 2020.  The staff from the second season is returning to produce the third season.

The "side M" version titled Room Mate features Hidari as an original character designer, with Chisato Nakata adapting Hidari's art into animation. It aired from April 12 to June 28, 2017. The anime's theme song titled  is performed by Kosuke Toriumi and Tomoaki Maeno (from episode 5), and Natsuki Hanae (from episode 9) Crunchyroll addes the anime series to its streaming service. A Blu-ray and DVD compilation containing all 12 episodes was released on August 25, 2017.

Episode list

Notes

References

External links
 

2017 anime television series debuts
Anime with original screenplays
Animated romance television series
Crunchyroll anime
Japanese romance television series
Romance anime and manga
Tokyo MX original programming
Typhoon Graphics
Zero-G (studio)